Psaumis of Camarina was a charioteer who won the Olympic  four-horse chariot race (tethrippon) in the 82nd Olympiad (452 BC). He probably had already won the two-mule chariot race in the previous edition of the 81st Olympiad and he also competed unsuccessfully in the mounted-horse race. He was the son of Akron, according to one of the odes written about him.

A pair of odes attributed to Pindar (Olympian 4 & 5) celebrate his victory, but these may actually be the work of a Sicilian imitator of Pindar.

The fourth ode provides the most biographical information

References

Ancient Greek rulers
Sicilian tyrants
5th-century BC Greek people
Ancient Sicily
Ancient Olympic competitors